Noral Edwin "Dick" Whittinghill (March 5, 1913 – January 24, 2001) was an American film and television actor, recording artist and radio DJ in the United States. His early music career included membership in The Pied Pipers vocal group which sang with Tommy Dorsey's big band.

Beginning in 1950, Whittinghill was for three decades the popular morning drive disc jockey at radio station KMPC in Los Angeles. During KMPC's heyday in the 1950s and 1960s, his fellow announcers included Ira Cook, Roger Carroll, Johnny Grant, Gary Owens, Johnny Magnus and Geoff Edwards. After his retirement, he was heard on a recorded Sunday program on KMPC, and later as afternoon drive personality at KPRZ, Los Angeles, reversing his traditional KMPC role, as former KMPC afternoon DJ Gary Owens was then KPRZ morning man.

Among the features of his program were the "story records," sent in by listeners, in which a short anecdote was completed with a line from a song. For example, the spider told Little Miss Muffet, "You can keep the curds but give me...All the Way (whey). (using Frank Sinatra's song).

Whittinghill had a minor national chart record. His narration "The Square" reached #144 on the Record World chart in May, 1965.

Helen Trump
Whittinghill also spoofed the long-running radio serial, "The Romance of Helen Trent" with "The Romance of Helen Trump", written and narrated by Whittinghill and Foster Brooks. "Helen Trump" was "The story that asks the question 'Can a woman of 35?... 'Find love and romance with a man twice her age?'" One of Helen's suitors was a politician named C. Dewey Detterwick, with whom, Whittinghill said, Helen doesn't drive any more, because when C. Dewey drives, he sees spots—lonely spots.

Television appearances
Whittinghill made television appearances as well, including a number of appearances on Dragnet in the 1960s, once as himself. A favorite of producer Jack Webb, he also appeared in a 1971 episode of Webb's Adam-12. He always signed off from his morning show with "I'm walkin' out the door, with you on my mind..." from the Nat King Cole record, "Walkin'". A sly punster and a master of double-entendre, longtime listeners knew that Montana-born Whittinghill was really "walkin' out the door with ewe on [his] mind".

His morning traffic reporter was Paul Pierce. Dick nicknamed him Panther Pierce. Whittinghill made great use of Freddy Fill and his Orchestra to fill the last few seconds of air time before news broadcasts. Upon his retirement from KMPC in August 1980, he was succeeded in morning drive by another legendary Los Angeles radio voice, Robert W. Morgan.

Whittinghill was inducted into the Radio Hall of Fame as of November 8, 2008.

Discography
 The Romance of Helen Trump (A Soap Opera) (Dobre Records DR1062, 1978)

Filmography

External links
Radio Hall of Fame website 
Industry Central profile of Dick Whittinghill

Male actors from Montana
American male film actors
Radio personalities from Los Angeles
American male television actors
1913 births
2001 deaths
20th-century American male actors
The Pied Pipers members